Serjan Repaj (born 5 September 2000) is an Albanian footballer who plays as a centre back for FK Apolonia Fier in the Kategoria Superiore.

Career

Vllaznia
In 2018, following several years in the club's youth academy, Repaj signed a senior contract with the club. He made his competitive debut for the club on 2 October 2019, playing the entirety of a 2-0 Cup victory over Burreli. Repaj made his Albanian Superliga debut later that season, coming on as a 71st-minute substitute for Arsid Kruja in a 5–2 away defeat to Laçi.

References

External links
Serjan Repaj at UEFA Youth League

2000 births
Living people
KF Vllaznia Shkodër players
FK Apolonia Fier players
Kategoria Superiore players
Albanian footballers
Association football defenders